Joe Germanese (born June 4, 1985) is an American soccer player.

Germanese made his full professional debut and scored his first career goal for Revolution on 1 July 2008, in a US Open Cup third-round game against Richmond Kickers. Prior to playing professionally, he played for the Duke Blue Devils. He was known as a ruthless finisher.

During 2008 Germanese also spent a short spell on loan at USL Second Division side Western Mass Pioneers.  The Revolution released him at the end of the 2008 season.

References

External links
New England Revolution bio

American soccer players
Cary Clarets players
Duke Blue Devils men's soccer players
Des Moines Menace players
Living people
New England Revolution players
Major League Soccer players
USL Second Division players
USL League Two players
Vanderbilt Commodores men's soccer players
Western Mass Pioneers players
1985 births
New England Revolution draft picks
Soccer players from St. Louis
Association football defenders